Pilea mollis is a species of flowering plant in the family Urticaceae. It is used as an ornamental plant, particularly the cultivar 'Moon Valley'.

References

mollis